Salamanca Market is a street market in Salamanca Place, Hobart, Tasmania, Australia.  

The Salamanca Market is one of Tasmania's most visited tourist attractions and has won many awards for excellence. 

Located in historic Salamanca Place, next to the Hobart waterfront, the market has over 300 stallholders, and operates every Saturday between 8.30 am and 3.00 pm.

Tasmania's biggest selection of locally made products can be explored including hand-worked glass, Tasmanian timbers, stylish clothing, bespoke jewellery, organic produce, artworks, bath and body care, ceramics, leather goods, handcrafted cheeses, breads, wines and spirits, and hot foods.

It is owned and operated by the City of Hobart.

1970s
The original idea of running a Community Market in Hobart's Salamanca Place was suggested to Alderman John Clemente in 1971 by the National Council of Women Tasmania through their then President Mrs Grace Montgomery. Alderman Clemente promoted the concept to the Hobart City Council and the Council's Resolution to trial a market was passed on 28 June 1971. The first trial market was held on the first Saturday in November 1971(2 November 1971). It consisted of 6 stalls, all operated by members of the National Council of Women.  The market was a success from the start and was held as a trial each week until approvals from the City and State were finalised.  The initial market, consisting of about 12 stalls, was located at the Silos end of Salamanca Place and held 7 months after the council's resolution on 22 January 1972.

Salamanca Market operated just in the summer for the first few years of its life. It started 4 weeks before Christmas and ran until Easter. It proved to be so popular and successful that the Tasmanian Puppet Theatre, in 1975, established a Winter Market. In 1977 they were joined and aided in their market's operation by the Salamanca Arts Centre.

Salamanca Market had grown quite considerably by 1977, with many stallholders attending regularly, so an informal Stallholders' Association, chaired by Philip Broughton, was established. He negotiated the concept of 'Permanent Stallholders' with the Council. This resulted in regular stallholders being identified, assigned fixed sites and paying rent in advance.

1980s
By this time the Market had grown to about 150 stalls and now encompassed most of the lower part of Salamanca Place stretching from its origins near the Silos up to Montpellier Retreat.

The Salamanca Stallholders Association was officially established on 19 February 1987.

Later that year the Council took over the running of the Winter Market from the Arts Centre. Over the next year or so the Summer Market's opening hours were changed from 9am-1pm to 9am-2pm.

1990s
In April 1992 the Southern Star reported that Salamanca Market was attended by between 10,000 and 12,000 people every week. Later in the year the Market was extended up to Gladstone Street to increase the number of sites available to Casual Stallholders.

During 1993 the operating hours of the Market were increased from 9 am–2pm to 9am–3pm. The council gave away 10 stalls to individuals free of charge, while at the same time it annexed at least one stall from a permanent stall holder without compensation.

In 1995, more stalls were created in the car park area by the side of the Market near Montpellier Retreat and the sites were allocated to members of the Hmong Community. The following year, the Market was extended from Gladstone Street to Davey Street.

In 1998/9 a detailed feasibility study on the issue of a Sunday Market in Salamanca Place was undertaken and 3 Sunday Markets were trialed. They were not very successful and ongoing Sunday Markets in Salamanca Place were opposed by both the Stallholders Association and the Sullivans Cove Merchant's Association.

Since 2000
A series of Sunday Markets were run in Mawson Place during January and February 2001.

In September 2009 the Hobart City Council created a subsidiary that would manage the Salamanca Market as its sole shareholder. As the structure was being developed, the council sought input from stallholders who were pushing for a review of the licensing agreement.

Salamanca Market grew from 12 stalls in 1972 to 300 in 2010, becoming Tasmania's most visited tourist venue attracting up to 25,000–40,000 visitors every Saturday.

References

External links

Hobart City Council -Salamanca Market
Salamanca Website

Culture in Hobart
Retail markets in Australia
Tourist attractions in Hobart
1972 establishments in Australia
Retail buildings in Tasmania